Chick is a 1928 British silent drama film directed by A. V. Bramble and starring Bramwell Fletcher, Trilby Clark and Chili Bouchier. The film was made at Islington Studios by British Lion. It was based on the 1923 novel of the same title by Edgar Wallace. It was remade in 1936 starring Sydney Howard in the title role.

Cast
Bramwell Fletcher as Chick Beane 
Trilby Clark as Gwenda Maynard 
Chili Bouchier as Minnie Jarvis 
Rex Maurice as Marquis of Mansar 
Edward O'Neill as Mr. Leither 
John Cromer as Mr. Jarvis

References

Bibliography
Low, Rachael. History of the British Film, 1918-1929. George Allen & Unwin, 1971. .
Wood, Linda. British Films 1927-1939. British Film Institute, 1986.

External links

1928 drama films
British drama films
Films directed by A. V. Bramble
British silent feature films
Films based on British novels
Films based on works by Edgar Wallace
British black-and-white films
1920s British films
Silent drama films